The differences between baseball and softball can be made as softball is directly descended from baseball. An observer of one game would find the other very similar, but there are several important rule differences.

Fastpitch softball is more popular in competitive leagues, especially at the college and international tournament levels, while slow pitch is more popular in recreational leagues where the relative skill levels of different players may vary widely. The different rules of slowpitch can be viewed as maintaining a competitive balance for less skilled players by eliminating certain strategies (e.g., base stealing and bunting) which require a high level of skill to counter. Additionally, recreational leagues may impose their own ground rules, either for competitive balance or to meet local constraints (e.g., a time limit may be imposed on a game to ensure multiple games can be played in one day).
A regulation softball is significantly larger than a regulation baseball. A softball measures between 11.88 and 12.13 inches in circumference and weighs between 6.25 and 7.00 ounces; a baseball measures between 9.00 and 9.25 inches in circumference and weighs between 5.00 and 5.25 ounces.

Table of comparison

See also 
 Baseball rules
 Comparison between cricket and baseball

References

External links 
 
 
 

Baseball rules
 Softball
Baseball, and softball
 Sports rules and regulations